George N. Moloney (19 October 1894 – 31 May 1959) was an  Australian rules footballer who played with South Melbourne in the Victorian Football League (VFL).

Notes

External links 

1894 births
1959 deaths
Australian rules footballers from Victoria (Australia)
Sydney Swans players